The Chatham County Courthouse is a historic courthouse located at Pittsboro, Chatham County, North Carolina.  It sits at the center of town in the middle of a traffic circle.  It was built in 1881 for $10,666 and is a two-story rectangular brick structure
in the Late Victorian style. It features a two-story classical portico crowned with a distinctive three-stage cupola.  A one-story addition was built in the 1930s by the Works Progress Administration. In 1959, extensive renovations were performed on the building.

It was listed on the National Register of Historic Places in 1979.  It is located in the Pittsboro Historic District.

A fire on March 24, 2010, did great damage to the building which was in the midst of another renovation.  The restored building reopened April 20, 2013 with an exhibit covering Chatham County history on the first floor and a courtroom on the second.

In 1907, the county gave a license to the United Daughters of the Confederacy to place a statue of a Confederate soldier outside the courthouse.  In 2019, the Chatham County Board of Commissioners voted to rescind this license, and the statue was removed as part of the trend toward removal of Confederate monuments and memorials in the 2010s.

References

Works Progress Administration in North Carolina
Courthouses on the National Register of Historic Places in North Carolina
Government buildings completed in 1881
National Register of Historic Places in Chatham County, North Carolina
County courthouses in North Carolina
Clock towers in North Carolina
Buildings and structures in Chatham County, North Carolina
Pittsboro, North Carolina
Individually listed contributing properties to historic districts on the National Register in North Carolina
1881 establishments in North Carolina